Tommerup is a town in central Denmark with a population of 1,545 (1 January 2022), located in Assens Municipality on the island of Funen.

Near Tommerup there is the tallest construction in Denmark (except Greenland), the 321.3 metre tall guyed mast of Brylle transmitter.

Although Tommerup was the municipal seat of the former Tommerup Municipality, it was just the second largest town of the municipality, surpassed by Tommerup Stationsby.

Notable people 
 Karen Egdal (born 1978 in Tommerup) a Danish former swimmer who won two silver medals in the 50 m butterfly event at the European championships in 2000 and competed at the 1996 Summer Olympics

References

Cities and towns in the Region of Southern Denmark
Populated places in Funen
Assens Municipality